Peter Lloyd Rogers CBE (29 December 1947 – 28 January 2020) was a British businessman, who was chief executive of Babcock International Group plc, a British multinational support services company specialising in managing complex assets and infrastructure in safety- and mission-critical environments. He was previously employed by Ford Motor Company and was also an executive director of Courtaulds and deputy chief executive of Acordis.

Early life
Rogers was educated at Wymondham College, Norfolk, and graduated from the University of Manchester in 1969 with a law degree. He gained ACA and FCA accountancy qualifications in the 1970s.

Career
Rogers was the chief executive of Babcock International from 1 August 2003 until he retired in August 2016. He was succeeded as CEO by Archie Bethel, chief executive of Babcock's marine & technology division.  He was appointed CBE in the 2011 Birthday Honours.

Personal life
Rogers was married twice, with two children and a stepdaughter. He was a keen rugby fan.

He died on 28 January 2020, at the age of 72.

Notes

1947 births
2020 deaths
British chief executives
British corporate directors
British accountants
Commanders of the Order of the British Empire
People from Rugby, Warwickshire
People educated at Wymondham College
Alumni of the University of Manchester